Kayne Lawton (born 31 May 1989) is an Australian former professional rugby league footballer who last played for AS Carcassonne in the Elite One Championship. He previously played for the Gold Coast Titans in the National Rugby League.

Playing career
He made his NRL debut in round 20 of the 2009 NRL season against the Brisbane Broncos.  In the 2010 and 2011 seasons, Lawton managed to make only one appearance in each year.  In the 2011 NRL season, the Gold Coast finished last on the table and claimed the wooden spoon.

On 12 November 2012, Lawton signed a one-year contract with the Manly-Warringah Sea Eagles but he failed to make any appearances for the first grade team in his time there.

In August 2015 Lawton signed with AS Carcassonne in the Elite One Championship.

Personal life
Lawton is the older brother of Karl Lawton.

References

External links
NRL profile
Kayne Lawton at the Gold Coast Titans official website.

1989 births
Living people
Australian rugby league players
Gold Coast Titans players
Tweed Heads Seagulls players
Rugby league hookers
Rugby league halfbacks
AS Carcassonne players
Rugby league players from Penrith, New South Wales